The Fort Erie Meteors are a Canadian junior ice hockey team based in Fort Erie, Ontario, Canada.  They play in the Golden Horseshoe division of the Greater Ontario Junior Hockey League.

History
The Meteors originated in the Niagara District Junior B Hockey League in the 1960s.  The Meteors stuck with the Niagara league until the bitter end, winning the league's final championship in 1979.  The next year they entered the Golden Horseshoe Junior Hockey League.

As of 2007, the Meteors are in the Golden Horseshoe Division of the Greater Ontario Junior Hockey League.

On December 31, 2012, owner and general manager Tony Passero pulled the Meteors from the ice and after two minutes the game was forfeited to their opponent, Port Colborne Pirates.  Passero had been ejected from the game for his reaction to his son, one of his team's players, being hit from behind by an opponent and the referees only calling a roughing minor.  He was suspended from team functions by the Ontario Hockey Association for two seasons as well as the remaining 27 games of the current season.  As well, the team was fined $2750.

Season-by-season results

Notable alumni
National Hockey League players:
 Randy Burridge
 Stan Drulia
 Bill Huard
 Mike Lalor
 Jarrod Skalde

Other professional league players:
 Rick Morocco

References

External links
Meteors Webpage
GOJHL Webpage

Golden Horseshoe Junior B Hockey League teams
1957 establishments in Ontario
Ice hockey clubs established in 1957
Fort Erie, Ontario